Ludwig Epple House is a historic home located at New Harmony, Posey County, Indiana.  It was built about 1823, and is a two-story, Harmonist frame dwelling. It has a gable roof.  It is an example of the standardized, mass-produced form of Rappite built dwellings.

It was listed on the National Register of Historic Places in 1984.  It is located in the New Harmony Historic District.

References

New Harmony, Indiana
Houses on the National Register of Historic Places in Indiana
Houses completed in 1823
Houses in Posey County, Indiana
National Register of Historic Places in Posey County, Indiana
Historic district contributing properties in Indiana